John Augustus Becher (March 13, 1833December 30, 1915) was a German American immigrant, businessman, and Republican politician.  He was a member of the Wisconsin State Assembly, representing Milwaukee during the 1873 session and served several years on Wisconsin's board of immigration.

Biography

Born in Weimar, Germany, Becher emigrated to the United States in 1853 and then settled in Milwaukee, Wisconsin, in 1857. During the American Civil War, Becher served in the 34th Wisconsin Infantry Regiment and was quartermaster. Becher was in the real estate business. He was a member of the Wisconsin State Board of Immigration from 1869 to 1871. Becher served in the Wisconsin State Assembly in 1873 and was a Republican. He then served on the Milwaukee School Board from 1873 to 1877. Becher died in a hospital in Milwaukee, Wisconsin.

Notes

1833 births
1915 deaths
German emigrants to the United States
People from Weimar
Politicians from Milwaukee
People of Wisconsin in the American Civil War
Businesspeople from Milwaukee
School board members in Wisconsin
Republican Party members of the Wisconsin State Assembly
19th-century American politicians
19th-century American businesspeople